is a Japanese manga series written and illustrated by Ran Kuze. The series began serialization in Kodansha's Weekly Shōnen Magazine in May 2021, with its chapters collected in eight tankōbon volumes as of January 2023. The series is licensed in English by Kodansha USA.

Plot
Mona Kawai, a popular queen bee, is happy that everyone at her high school adores her, except for the new transfer student Medaka Kuroiwa, who looks angry all the time, and won't even look at her. Mona then makes it her mission to make him fall in love with her, but the more she tries, and the more Medaka resists, the more she finds herself falling in love with him. It turns out that Medaka is a monk-in-training who is forbidden by his temple masters from falling in love, but he finds it difficult to resist Mona's advances. Other girls join in either as Mona's rivals or supportive friends.

Characters

 Mona is a beautiful and friendly second-year high school girl who is originally from Osaka Prefecture. She prides herself on being the queen bee of the school, charming all the boys, until she meets Medaka. She then tries to win him over but ends up falling in love with him, although she denies the latter part. She occasionally reverts to her Kansai dialect when flustered. She is easily jealous of other girls who vie for Medaka's attention. Most of the story is told from her perspective. Issue 2021 No. 29 of Weekly Shonen Magazine has pictures of Enako cosplaying Mona as well as characters in other series.

 Medaka is a second-year high school boy who is a monk-in-training at his family's temple. He is instructed not to fall in love with any girls, so he finds it rather frustrating that these city girls give him so much attention.

 Medaka and Mona's classmate greatly admires Mona, and has a collection of phone photos of her. Mona initially thinks of her as her love rival. After seeing Mona's interacting with Medaka, Tsubomi easily figures out that Mona likes him, and tries to push Mona towards the relationship.
 
 A first-year student and star basketball player, she has a crush on Medaka, and declares she is Mona's love rival.
 Tomo
 Mona's childhood friend who transfers to her school. She also finds Medaka attractive.

Publication
Written and illustrated by Ran Kuze, Medaka Kuroiwa Is Impervious to My Charms was originally published as a one-shot in Kodansha's Weekly Shōnen Magazine on December 23, 2020, before beginning serialization in the same magazine on May 26, 2021. Kodansha has collected its chapters into individual tankōbon volumes. The first volume was released on August 17, 2021. As of January 17, 2023, eight volumes have been released.

The series is licensed in English by Kodansha USA; the first English volume was released in digital on March 8, 2022. During their panel at Anime Expo 2022, Kodnasha USA announced that they would begin publishing the manga in print in Q2 2023.

Volume list

Reception
In January 2022, Kodansha reported that the series had over 150,000 copies in circulation.

Works cited
 "Ch." and "Vol." is shortened form for chapter and volume of the Medaka Kuroiwa Is Impervious to My Charms manga.

References

External links
  
 

Kodansha manga
Romantic comedy anime and manga
School life in anime and manga
Shōnen manga